Bellou is a former commune in the Calvados département in the Normandy region in northwestern France. On 1 January 2016, it was merged into the new commune of Livarot-Pays-d'Auge.

Geography
The commune of Bellou is situated 18 kilometres from Lisieux, in the Pays d'Auge.

Population

Monuments
The Manoir de Bellou, built in 1720, and its 16th-century dovecote, have been registered as a monument historique by the French Ministry of Culture since 1923. Its cider press building with its machinery and cellar were added to the register in 2004.

People linked to the commune
 Rose Harel, poet and goguettère, was born here on 8 April 1826. She died in Lisieux on 4 July 1885.

See also 
 Communes of the Calvados department

References

External links

 Statistical data, INSEE
 

Former communes of Calvados (department)
Calvados communes articles needing translation from French Wikipedia
Populated places disestablished in 2016